Vladimir Petrovich Drukovsky (born 2 July 1989) is a Russian former professional footballer.

Club career
He made his professional debut in the Russian Second Division in 2006 for FC Krylia Sovetov-SOK Dimitrovgrad.

He made his Russian Football National League debut for FC Irtysh Omsk on 10 April 2010 in a game against FC Volgar-Gazprom Astrakhan.

External links

References

1989 births
Sportspeople from Omsk
Living people
Russian footballers
Russia youth international footballers
Association football defenders
FC SKA-Khabarovsk players
FC Irtysh Omsk players
FC Sakhalin Yuzhno-Sakhalinsk players
FC Lada-Tolyatti players
PFC Krylia Sovetov Samara players
FC Akron Tolyatti players
FC Tolyatti players